Everything Beautiful Is Far Away is a 2017 independent science-fiction fantasy film written and directed by Pete Ohs, co-directed by Andrea Sisson, starring Julia Garner and Joseph Cross. It premiered in competition at the 2017 Los Angeles Film Festival where it received the U.S. Fiction Cinematography Award.

Plot

Traveling across a barren landscape, Lernert digs through piles of rubbish in an attempt to build a body for his companion Susan, the unresponsive robot head who hangs from the back of his pack. The pair comes across Rola, a spirited young woman who lacks survival skills but makes up for the deficiency with sheer determination. This unlikely trio navigates the harsh desert in search of a mythical water basin that could replenish their depleted resources and renew their will to carry on.

Cast
 Julia Garner as Rola
 Joseph Cross as Lernert
 C.S. Lee as The Stranger
 Jillian Mayer as Susan

Reception
Everything Beautiful Is Far Away premiered at the 2017 Los Angeles Film Festival and received the U.S. Fiction Cinematography Award. It later screened at the Tacoma Film Festival, receiving the Best Director and Best Cinematography Awards and at the Eastern Oregon Film Festival, receiving the award for Best Feature.

Alex Billington of FirstShowing.net reviewed the film positively saying "there's a sublime simplicity to Everything Beautiful is Far Away that also helps make it feel even more endearing as a cinematic feature." The film was acquired for distribution by The Orchard.

References

External links
 
 
 MANALI PICTURES

2017 films
American independent films
2010s science fiction films
2017 fantasy films
American science fantasy films
2010s English-language films
2010s American films